Sione Feingatau Mafi Iloa is a Tongan politician and former member of the Legislative Assembly of Tonga.  He represented the administrative division of Niuas.

Iloa worked as a school teacher. He was first elected to the Legislative Assembly in the 2008 election.  Shortly before the 2010 elections he requested the Prime Minister grant MPs a bonus payment as "a blanket to keep themselves warm". He subsequently lost his seat.

References

Members of the Legislative Assembly of Tonga
Living people
Tongan schoolteachers
People from Niuas
Year of birth missing (living people)